Hypoptopoma brevirostratum is a species of catfish of the family Loricariidae.

This catfish reaches a maximum length of  SL. It is demersal, being found in fresh water in the tropics.
 
Hypoptopoma brevirostratum is native to South America, occurring in tributaries of Amazon River between the confluence of Ucayali-Marañon rivers and Manaus.

Interactions with humans
Hypoptopoma brevirostratum is harmless to humans.

References

Aquino, A.E. and S.A. Schaefer, 2010. Systematics of the genus Hypoptopoma Günther, 1868 (Siluriformes, Loricariidae). Bull. Amer. Mus. Nat. Hist. 336:1-110. 

Hypoptopomatini
Catfish of South America
Fish of Bolivia
Fish of Brazil
Taxa named by Adriana Elbia Aquino
Taxa named by Scott Allen Schaefer
Fish described in 2010